Latt Zaw (born 4 October 1957) is a Burmese boxer. He competed in the men's lightweight event at the 1984 Summer Olympics. At the 1984 Summer Olympics, he lost to Christopher Ossai of Nigeria.

References

External links
 

1957 births
Living people
Burmese male boxers
Olympic boxers of Myanmar
Boxers at the 1984 Summer Olympics
Place of birth missing (living people)
Lightweight boxers